The 2019 ISA World Surfing Games were held at Kisakihama Beach in Miyazaki, Japan, from 7 to 15 September 2019. The event was organised by the International Surfing Association (ISA).

Medal summary

Medallists

Medal table

Olympic qualification

The event contributed towards qualification for the 2020 Olympics in Tokyo, where surfing will make its debut as an Olympic sport. In both the men's and women's competitions, the highest-placed eligible athlete from each of Africa, Asia, Europe and Oceania gained provisional qualification for the 2020 Olympics. The Pan American Games provided the continental qualification places for the Americas.

Qualified athletes

Men

Women

See also

2019 World Surf League

References

External links

International Surfing Association

ISA World Surfing Games
ISA World Surfing Games
ISA World Surfing Games
ISA World Surfing Games
ISA World Surfing Games
ISA World Surfing Games